Peribatodes umbraria, the olive-tree beauty, is a moth of the family Geometridae. The species was first described by Jacob Hübner in 1809. It can be found in southern Europe.

The wingspan is about 43 mm.

The larva feeds on oak.

References
Olive-tree beauty at UKMoths
Fauna Europaea
Lepiforum e.V.

Boarmiini
Moths of Europe
Taxa named by Jacob Hübner
Moths described in 1809